William N. Reidy (January 9, 1912 – May 30, 1952) was an American politician who served in the New York State Assembly from 1949 to 1952. He was married to Dorothy Smith of Staten Island on April 16, 1939.

References

1912 births
1952 deaths
Democratic Party members of the New York State Assembly
20th-century American politicians